Aphelia conscia is a species of moth of the family Tortricidae. It is found in Fars Province, Iran.

References

Moths described in 1981
Aphelia (moth)
Moths of Asia